National Day of Concorde is a national holiday in Niger, celebrated every 24 April since 1995.

History
Concord Day marks the anniversary of the signing of the 24 April 1995 Peace Accord between the Government of Niger and the Organisation of Armed Resistance (Organization de Resistance Armee, ORA) at the Congressional Palace in Niamey (Palais des Congrès de à Niamey).  While this accord was signed only by some armed groups and sporadic fighting continued until 1999, it marked the beginning of the end of the 1990 rebellion in the north and east of the country carried out by elements of Tuareg, Toubou, and other communities.  The final peace agreement was celebrated with a "Flame of Peace" in which weapons were burned in Agadez on 25 September 2000, a date that is also commemorated each year in some communities.

Celebrations
The Concorde Festival also celebrates the 2009 agreement to end a renewed Tuareg based insurgency, as well as cross cultural tolerance, peace, and social justice, in this diverse nation.

Niger's National Day of Concorde is celebrated with street parties and educational and cultural events; speeches by the President of Niger and other leaders; and events designed to instill in youth love of nation and cross-cultural peace. The National Day of Concorde is a Public Holiday in Niger, in which businesses and government offices close.

See also
Tuareg Rebellion (1990–1995)
Tuareg Rebellion (2007–2009)
Public holidays in Niger

References

Public holidays in Niger
Unity days
April observances